Patrick Alan Listach (born September 12, 1967) is the former Manager of the Triple-A Tacoma Rainiers of the Pacific Coast League and a former Major League Baseball shortstop, minor league manager, and major league third base coach.

Amateur career
A native of Natchitoches, Louisiana, Listach is the grandson of fellow major leaguer Nora Listach. He attended Natchitoches High School and went on to McLennan Community College in Waco, Texas, where he played college baseball for the Highlanders. Listach transferred to Arizona State University, continuing his collegiate career with the Arizona State Sun Devils.

Professional career
Listach was drafted in the fifth round of the 1988 Major League Baseball Draft by the Milwaukee Brewers.

After being called up from the minor leagues by the Brewers in April, Listach became a vital member of a team that won 92 games and contended for the American League playoffs. Listach became the first Brewer to steal 50 or more bases in a single season. His 54 stolen bases in 1992 ranked second in the American League, only to the total accrued by Kenny Lofton, another prominent rookie from the Cleveland Indians, during that season. Listach would go on to win the 1992 American League Rookie of the Year award.

In 1996, Listach was traded to the New York Yankees along with Graeme Lloyd for outfielder Gerald Williams and pitcher Bob Wickman. With rookie Derek Jeter installed at shortstop, the Yankees intended to use Listach as a backup outfielder, as they made the trade specifically to acquire Lloyd. Listach, however, had suffered what was first thought to be a bruise two days prior to the trade.  The injury turned out to be a broken bone in his foot. The Yankees returned Listach to the Brewers, accepting shortstop Gabby Martinez instead.

Listach played only 52 games in the majors after 1996, all for the Houston Astros in 1997. Listach spent 1998 Spring Training with the Seattle Mariners, who released him before the season. He spent that season with the Triple-A affiliates of the Cleveland Indians and Philadelphia Phillies before retiring.

Coaching career

Listach became a manager in the Chicago Cubs minor league system. In 2008 Listach was honored as Pacific Coast League Manager of the Year by peers and league media representatives for leading the Iowa Cubs to an 83-59 record and a playoff appearance.

Listach became the Washington Nationals' third-base coach starting with the  season.

Listach served as bench coach for the Chicago Cubs for the 2011 season, replacing Alan Trammell who left to become the Diamondbacks bench coach. Listach was replaced by new bench coach, Jamie Quirk, during the 2011 off-season, and became the Cubs third-base coach for the 2012 season. He became the minor league infield coordinator for the Los Angeles Dodgers organization in 2013.

Listach was hired by the Houston Astros to be their first base coach on October 22, 2013; he was fired by the Astros on October 17, 2014.

Listach then returned to the Mariners' organization when he was named manager of the Class AAA Tacoma Rainiers of the Pacific Coast League, on January 12, 2015. Following the 2018 season, after compiling a 281-286 record in four seasons, the Mariners announced that Listach's contract with Tacoma was not being renewed.

On July 1, 2019, Listach was announced as the new manager of the Acereros de Monclova of the Mexican League. Despite joining the team midway through the season, he led them to a division championship, and later their first-ever league championship. After the 2020 Mexican League season was canceled due to the COVID-19 pandemic, Listach returned to the club for the 2021 season. They once again qualified for the playoffs, but fell to the Toros de Tijuana in the quarterfinals. Listach was dismissed by the team following the season.

On January 6, 2022, Listach was hired to serve as the manager for the Jersey Shore BlueClaws, the High-A affiliate of the Philadelphia Phillies organization.

References

External links

Listach named 2008 PCL Manager of the Year

1967 births
Living people
Iowa Cubs managers
Mexican League baseball managers
Major League Baseball Rookie of the Year Award winners
Milwaukee Brewers players
Houston Astros players
Houston Astros coaches
Sportspeople from Natchitoches, Louisiana
Baseball players from Louisiana
African-American baseball coaches
African-American baseball managers
African-American baseball players
McLennan Highlanders baseball players
Major League Baseball shortstops
Beloit Brewers players
Stockton Ports players
Denver Zephyrs players
El Paso Diablos players
New Orleans Zephyrs players
Buffalo Bisons (minor league) players
Scranton/Wilkes-Barre Red Barons players
Natchitoches Central High School alumni
Arizona State Sun Devils baseball players
21st-century African-American people
20th-century African-American sportspeople